St. Peter's Lutheran Church and School is a Lutheran church in Walmore, New York, that is a member of the Lutheran Congregations in Mission for Christ (LCMC). It formerly was a member of the Evangelical Lutheran Church in America (ELCA).

Background
St. Peter's has its roots in Germany when an entire village chose to immigrate to America rather than give up their religious heritage. The congregation started a Christian Day School in 1843, that continues to provide education for children from the surrounding communities.

St. Peter's originally was a member of the Buffalo Synod, which through a series of mergers became part of the American Lutheran Church, and finally, the ELCA. The need to make Christ known has most recently taken the shape of exchanging the structures of denominational Lutheranism for the freedom of function offered by LCMC.

School history
The first educational building in Walmore was built of clay and timber at the north end of a lot donated by Friedrich Haseley. The back of the building was partitioned off and served as living quarters for the teacher.

In 1873, the school burned. The fire was discovered in the back part of the building during school hours. Teacher F. Wilhelm Wendt got the children to safety and saved as much of the furnishings and equipment as possible, while one of the boys, following Mr. Wendt's orders, ran over to the church and rang the church bell. The furious clanging of the bell, coming unexpectedly in the middle of the afternoon, notified the Walmore families that some disaster had occurred. Men gathered at the school as quickly as possible to save what they could and put out the blaze.

It was not possible to repair the building, however. The second school, a brick structure, was erected in 1875. The school building which served for 77 years had one room where seven grades were taught by one teacher.

The concept of this kind of arrangement seems impossible today. The basics of reading, writing, and arithmetic were taught. Proper writing technique was very important at the school. A poor or incorrect technique would result in a lower grade or rewriting the assignment. Other subjects included geography, history, and spelling. Spelling bees were a fun way of sharpening skills.

Teaching religion was of first importance. For the first and second grades this meant memorizing Luther's Small Catechism; third, fourth and fifth graders would continue by memorizing the so-called "large catechism", which was a question and answer explanation of the five parts of the catechism as well as accompanying Bible verses. By the time a child was confirmed he was expected to have memorized the entire catechism. The sixth and seventh grades prepared for confirmation by attending daily hour-long confirmation classes with the pastor.

Music has always been a very important part of the curriculum - hymns memorized and sung in school and for Christmas Eve services and school picnic programs; by 1960 training was expanded to include theory as well as singing in four part harmony.

Classes were taught mostly in the German language until World War I. Anti-German sentiment was so strong that the schools were told to introduce teaching classes in English. German and English reading and writing (German script) continued to be taught well into the 1930s and German language religion, and confirmation remained in effect until the early 1940s. A peculiar custom was that the day after confirmation (usually in April) the newly-confirmed students would continue their schooling in the public school, rather than going to the next grade at the beginning of the school year.

This seemingly overwhelming schedule of classes, and variety of subjects to be taught by a single teacher, required much cooperation from the parents as well as very strict discipline of the students. It usually fell to the mothers to help the children with daily memorization work; homework in most subjects was also on a daily basis.

Strict discipline meant "no talking aloud without permission, ask permission to get up from your seat, no whispering, no turning around, no gum chewing, just sit and study".  Minor infractions meant writing "lines 10-25" a certain number of times. Major offenses could mean writing 100-200 "lines", staying in at recess or lunch hour, or for the incorrigible ones, punishment could mean being sent out to cut a willow branch and it would then be used to spank the child.

Christmas Eve was a time of great expectation, even as it is today. Hours had been spent in preparation for the church program; songs had to be rehearsed, recitations memorized. At the end of the service, the trustees distributed a candy bag to each child.  The contents were usually a small paper bag of hard candy, chocolate drops, and sugar cream candy, while the large bag held an assortment of unshelled nuts.

Before electricity was installed, the Christmas tree was trimmed with candles. Trustees were assigned to sit near the tree with buckets of sand, in case the tree caught fire.

The school built in 1875 remained in use until 1954. The brick building was one large school room. There was a pot bellied stove in the northwest comer to provide heat and as many desks as required to accommodate the fluctuating number of students. The unheated entrance was used as a cloak room. There was no indoor plumbing; two "little houses" complete with Sears catalogs served as "Johnny on the Spot". Students were also responsible for chores around the school. The girls took turns sweeping the room; the boys provided wood for the stove, removed ashes, and also carried water from the well to the water container.

By the late 1940s, it became increasingly apparent that the old school was inadequate to serve the increasing number of students and the changing requirements in the educational system. The present school was dedicated in 1954 under the leadership of Reverend Martin Pempeit. Mrs. Pempeit and Miss Williams were the first teachers in the new school.

Subsequently, over the years the scope and size of St. Peter's Christian Day School has changed and increased to include foreign languages, home economics, and computer science. Present enrollment is 108 students, five full-time teachers, three part-time teachers, two part-time teachers aides, one part-time secretary and one part-time principal. The grades range from pre-school through grade 8. Parents and parishioners alike continue their commitment to provide an excellent educational opportunity for the children.

Church history 
Significant changes in the community took place after World War II. Many of the returning veterans found employment other than the farming they had left behind. New people moved into the community. Walmore was affected by the same changes as the rest of the nation.

English language services were not introduced at St. Peter's until the early 1930s. Almost exclusively German services were conducted until the early 1940s. The school dedication booklet dated 1953 lists the services for each Sunday as German service at 9:30 a.m. and English service at 10:45 a.m.

While High German is seldom used today, a number of parishioners are still very fluent in speaking Low German and often speak it in their homes.

External links
 Official website

Educational institutions established in 1843
Lutheran schools in New York (state)
Schools in Niagara County, New York
Private middle schools in New York (state)
Private elementary schools in New York (state)
1843 establishments in New York (state)
Lutheran Congregations in Mission for Christ